Melaleuca arcana is a small tree or large shrub in the myrtle family, Myrtaceae and is endemic to Cape York Peninsula in northern Australia. It has papery bark and small heads of white flowers in summer.

Description

The flowers are white or cream, sometimes pinkish and arranged in heads on the ends of branches which continue to grow after flowering and in the upper leaf axils. The stamens are arranged in 5 bundles around the flowers and each bundle contains 6 to 9 stamens. The seeds are released within a year when the fruits are mature.

Taxonomy and naming
The species was first formally described in 1968 by Stanley Thatcher Blake from a specimen collected north-west of Cooktown and west of Cape Bedford in Three Islands National Park. The specific epithet (arcana) is from the Latin arcanus, meaning "secret" or "mysterious" in reference to the species' apparent rarity.

Distribution and habitat
Melaleuca incana occurs on the east coast of Cape York Peninsula in the swales between sand dunes.

Conservation status
This melaleuca has the status "of least concern" in the Government of Queensland Nature Conservation Act 1992.

Uses

Agroforestry
This species is useful for sand stabilisation in coastal areas and it is a good source of honey.

Timber
The wood can be used for posts and railway ties.

Horticulture
In some situations this species may be preferable to Melaleuca leucadendron as a street tree because of its smaller size at maturity. It has been grown as far south as Brisbane.

References 

arcana
Myrtales of Australia
Flora of Queensland
Plants described in 1968